Endrendrum Punnagai is a 2013 Indian Tamil-language romantic comedy drama film written and directed by I. Ahmed starring Jiiva,  Trisha, Vinay, Santhanam, Andrea, and Nassar. The film has music by Harris Jayaraj and cinematography by R. Madhi. The film was launched officially in Chennai on 29 June 2012. Upon its release on 20 December 2013, the film met with positive reviews from critics and became a commercial success.

Plot
The movie starts with Goutham (Jiiva) as a kid, being told that women are all bad and are very selfish by his father Sridhar (Nassar) because his wife had eloped that day. They then move to Chennai, where Goutham meets Baby (Santhanam) and Sri (Vinay). The trio becomes inseparable friends. 15 years later, it is shown that they are running an advertisement agency, and Goutham has stopped speaking to his father. After a heated incident at a friend's bachelor party, the three friends promise to never get married. They get an advertising offer from Sunny (T. M. Karthik), who sends Priya (Trisha) to assist them with the ad. Sonia (Andrea), an international model, is assigned to act for the ad. On the day of the shoot, Sonia falls in love with Goutham, and when the ad is finished, she bites his ear. Goutham retaliates by slapping her. Sunny scolds Goutham and tells him that he will never work with him again, but Priya supports Goutham, telling Sunny that it was Sonia's fault for behaving unprofessionally. After the shoot, Goutham calls up Priya and thanks her for supporting him. While speaking to Goutham, Priya meets with an accident. He rushes her to the hospital, where she recovers the next day.

After a few days, Baby and Sri decide to get married. When Goutham gets to know about it, he gets furious and ends their friendship. On the same day of the marriage, Sridhar tells Priya that he got married a second time many years before for his son's sake, and that is the reason for Goutham's anger towards him. He requests Priya to take care of Goutham. Goutham and Priya get another contract with Sunny and Sonia, and they leave for Switzerland for the shooting. On the day of the shooting, Sonia recalls everything Goutham had done and asks him to apologize for his act. He refuses because he knows that it is not his fault and then tells Sonia to leave. Afterwards, Priya takes the role of Sonia and acts for the advertisement. During the shooting, Priya and Goutham fall in love. When they come back from Switzerland, Goutham meets his friend and introduces Priya as just a stranger whom he met in the flight. Hurt by Goutham's cheap behavior, she leaves the airport. Goutham after returning home calls Priya and asks her to return his watch that he has given to her when they were in foreign. Hurt further, Priya reaches Goutham's office next day and returns his watch. Before leaving, Priya informs Goutham to contact Sunny in future, indicating that she doesn't want to interact with Goutham anymore. Later Sunny and Goutham discuss about the remaining work in the project and during the discussion Sunny informs that Priya is getting married to her friend working in US. Sunny further adds that he knows the feeling between Priya and Goutham and advises Goutham not to cheat himself. Goutham meets Priya at a beach and there quoting the airport incident, Priya tells Goutham that he is too egoistic that he will hurt anyone to maintain his macho image. She further tells him that due to his ego he has stopped talking to his father and friends who are very close to him and she can't afford to live with him since she knows that he will stop talking to her even if there is a small misunderstanding between them. After telling this, Priya leaves and Goutham starts feeling guilty.

When Goutham gets back home, he goes into his father's room and notices many paintings of him being happy, a wish that his father wanted. Goutham then discovers that his father was ill and rushes him to the hospital, where the doctors say that his father is suffering from pancreatic cancer and cannot be treated. Goutham becomes heartbroken. Sri comes to meet him and tells him that he knew that Sridhar was suffering from this disease. Baby then comes and says that Sridhar was the one who compelled them to get married so that Goutham might change his mind and get married. As the three friends reconcile, Priya comes to the hospital to meet Sridhar, where Gautham apologizes and admits to Priya that he has fallen for her. The film ends a happy ending with Gautham and Priya getting engaged in front of a recovering Sridhar at the hospital.

Cast

 Jiiva as Goutham Sridhar
 Trisha as Priya
 Vinay as Sri Harshan "Sri"
 Santhanam as Baby
 Andrea as Sonia
 Nassar as Sridhar
 T. M. Karthik as Sunny
 Jagan as Sonia's manager
 Abhinay as Karthik
 Sriranjini as Priya's mother
 Sanjana Sarathy as Priya's sister
 Varsha Ashwathi as Sri's wife
 Tanuja Babu as Baby's wife
 Balaji Venugopal as Goutham, Sri & Baby's college mate
 Narayan Lucky as Goutham's friend
 Swaminathan as Sri's uncle
 Lollu Sabha Manohar as Current
 'Lollu Sabha' Easter
 Lingesh as Drunkard
 Raju Sundaram in a special appearance in the song "Ennatha Solla"

Production
In 2011, it was reported that Jiiva will collaborate with Vaamanan director I. Ahmed. Tamannaah, was selected to play lead heroine in the film and later in November she out from project due date issues,  which given bulk date  for Veeram movie.  In mid of November Trisha selected to play lead heroine in the ed film. Lisa Hayden who had been approached for a role in this flick was no longer doing that role due to date clashes. Andrea Jeremiah took up the role.

Soundtrack

Music was composed by Harris Jayaraj scoring for a Jiiva film for the third time after Ko and Nanban. The soundtrack album consist of 6 tracks. Harris Jayaraj and the director headed to Turkey for composing sessions. 2 songs for the film were recorded by early May 2012. A single track from the album titled "Vaan Engum Nee Minna" was released on 18 October. The album was released by Kamal Haasan on 24 October 2013  and within 24 hours of its release on the net, topped the iTunes India Charts. The soundtrack was met with positive reviews from critics, who claimed the album to be 'pleasant' with 'catchy songs that are sure to win hearts'.

Release
The film was given a U/A certificate by the Indian Censor Board due to "a few adult comedy scenes". The film released in 750 screens worldwide on 20 December 2013 along with Biriyani and the Hindi film Dhoom 3.

Critical reception
The film received positive reviews from critics. Sify wrote, "It's a feel – good breezy entertainer and it's got its heart in the right place. The film works big time due to director Ahmed's well- written script which encompass friendship, romance and an emotional father-son angle which has been handled sensitively". Behindwoods gave 3.5 stars out of 5 and wrote, "Ahmed's Endrendrum Punnagai is an extremely good looking film with beautiful people leading colorful and aspirational lifestyles. As an added bonus, the film also gifts you with moments that are genuinely likeable". The Hindu wrote, "The first half is largely fun and jokes and the film gently breezes along, thanks to the bonding and chemistry between the guys. The problem with Endrendrum Punnagai is that it takes itself a tad too seriously instead of living up to the title and keeping it light. There's just too much drama...clichés employed to infuse drama into the sluggish second half that is further burdened with songs". Deccan Herald wrote, "Endrendrum Punnagai is no great shakes as ensemble entertainer. It does have its moments. Beginning on a breezy note, it peters out into a languid tale in the latter half. With a plot as predictable as chicory coffee, especially after friction among friends Endrendrum Punnagai does not turn out everlasting happiness as its title suggests". Indiaglitz gave 3 out of 5 and wrote, "With a story behind everyone in the background and a lot of fun uniting the jigsaw pieces in the foreground, covering up all the sorrow as though it is a hassle-free life, the film is a different outlook on love and friendship. Endrendrum Punnagai, as aptly titled, is a story that urges to unlock the happiness behind our ego, and a film worth investing your time on". Hindustan Times gave 1.5 stars and wrote, "Endrendrum Punnagai is predictable piece of a movie where we know what would happen when Trisha Krishnan's Priya walks into the lives of the three men as a project consultant for an ad film being made by them. It is bad enough that much of Tamil cinema is clocked in clichés and crassness. What is worse is that it continues to handle actors with immense potential with utter callousness". Cinemalead rated Endrendrum Punnagai with 3.5 rating and wrote "Ahmed has put his efforts into Endrendrum Punnagai to make it a fresh film to watch. The concept of blending friendship, love and ego has worked here. Rom-coms are always fun and this one is no less. "

References

External links
 

2013 films
2010s buddy comedy films
2013 romantic comedy-drama films
2010s Tamil-language films
2010s coming-of-age comedy-drama films
Indian buddy comedy-drama films
Indian romantic comedy-drama films
Indian coming-of-age comedy-drama films
Films scored by Harris Jayaraj
2013 comedy films
2013 drama films